WRND (94.3 FM, "Rewind 94.3") is a commercial FM radio station licensed to Oak Grove, Kentucky with offices located in Clarksville, Tennessee. WRND and its sister stations are known as the "Five Star Radio Group" and is owned by Saga Communications.

History
The station had its beginning in 1965, licensed to Springfield, Tennessee as WDBL-FM. According to FCC records, the station changed calls on November 4, 2002, to WJOI-FM and then changed calls again on March 13, 2004, to WEGI. Saga Communications assumed ownership and control of the station on July 3, 2003, from Tuned In Broadcasting, Inc.

Saga Communications, Inc. had the FCC change the city of license to Oak Grove, Kentucky.

On April 15, 2009, WEGI-FM "Eagle 94.3" began simulcasting on WEGI AM 1370, one of Saga Communications, Inc.'s AM properties. They broadcast a new top of the hour FCC ID check as "WEGI-AM 1370, FORT CAMPBELL ... WEGI-FM 94.3 OAK GROVE". At this time, the call sign on 94.3 FM was changed from WEGI to WEGI-FM so that AM 1370 could change their call sign from WJQI to WEGI.

On December 26, 2013, WEGI-FM shifted their format to variety hits, branded as "Rewind 94.3". The station changed its call sign to WRND-FM on December 27, 2013, and then to the current WRND on March 5, 2018.

References

External links
Saga Communications Radio Stations
Rewind 94.3 website

RND (FM)
Classic hits radio stations in the United States
Christian County, Kentucky
Montgomery County, Tennessee
Radio stations established in 1979
1979 establishments in Tennessee